Traffic lights, traffic signals, or stoplights – known also as robots in South Africa – are signalling devices positioned at road intersections, pedestrian crossings, and other locations in order to control flows of traffic.

Traffic lights consist normally of three signals, transmitting meaningful information to drivers and riders through colours and symbols including arrows and bicycles. The regular traffic light colours are red, yellow (also known as amber), and green arranged vertically or horizontally in that order. Although this is internationally standardised, variations exist on national and local scales as to traffic light sequences and laws.

The method was first introduced in December 1868 on Parliament Square in London to reduce the need for police officers to control traffic. Since then, electricity and computerised control has advanced traffic light technology and increased intersection capacity. The system is also used for other purposes, for example, to control pedestrian movements, variable lane control (such as tidal flow systems or smart motorways), and railway level crossings.

History 

The first system of traffic signals was installed as a way to replace police officer control of vehicular traffic outside the Houses of Parliament in London on 9 December 1868. In the first two decades of the 20th century, semaphore traffic signals like the one in London were in use all over the United States with each state having its own design of the device. In many cases, it was controlled by a traffic officer who would blow a whistle before changing the commands on this signal to help alert travellers of the change.

In 1912, the first electric traffic light was developed by Lester Wire, a policeman in Salt Lake City, Utah. It was installed by the American Traffic Signal Company on the corner of East 105th Street and Euclid Avenue in Cleveland, Ohio. The first four-way, three-colour traffic light was created by police officer William Potts in Detroit, Michigan in 1920. He was concerned about how police officers at four different light signals could not change their lights all at the same time.  The answer was a third light that was coloured amber, which was the same colour used on the railroad. In 1922 traffic towers were beginning to be controlled by automatic timers. The main advantage of the use of the timer was that it saved cities money by replacing traffic officers. The city of New York was able to reassign all but 500 of its 6,000 officers working on the traffic squad; this saved the city $12,500,000.

The control of traffic lights made a big turn with the rise of computers in America in the 1950s. One of the best historical examples of computerized control of lights was in Denver in 1952. In 1967, the city of Toronto was the first to use more advanced computers that were better at vehicle detection. The computers maintained control over 159 signals in the cities through telephone lines.

Vehicular signals

A set of lights, known as a signal head, may have one, two, three, or more aspects. The most common signal type has three aspects facing the oncoming traffic: red on top, amber below, and green below that. Additional aspects may be fitted to the signal, usually to indicate specific restrictions or filter movements.

Meanings of signals 
The 1968 Vienna Convention on Road Signs and Signals Chapter III provides international standards for the setup of traffic signal operations. Not all states have ratified the convention. A three-colour signal head should have three non-flashing lights which are red, amber, and green, either arranged horizontally (on the side opposite to the direction of traffic) or vertically (with red on top). A two-colour signal head may be used in temporary operation and consists of red and green non-flashing lights. In both cases, all lights should be circular or arrow-shaped. Permissible signals for regulating vehicle traffic (other than public transport vehicles) are outlined in Article 23:

Green arrows are added to signals to indicate that drivers can travel in a particular direction, while the main lights for that approach are red, or that drivers can only travel in one particular direction. Alternatively, when combined with another green signal, they may indicate that turning traffic has priority over oncoming traffic (known as a "filter arrow"). Flashing amber arrows typically indicate that road users must give way (to other drivers and pedestrians) before making a movement in the direction of the arrow. These are used because they are safer, cause less delay, and are more flexible. Flashing amber arrows will normally be located below the solid amber.

Green arrows 

Arrow aspects may be used to permit certain movements or convey other messages to road users. A green arrow may display to require drivers to turn in a particular direction only or to allow drivers to continue in a particular direction when the signal is red. Generally, a green phase is illuminated at the beginning of the green phase (a "leading turn") or at the end of the green phase (a "lagging turn"). An 'indicative arrow' may be displayed alongside a green light. This indicates to drivers that oncoming traffic is stopped, such that they do not need to give way to that traffic when turning across it. As right-turning traffic (left-side drive) or left-turning traffic (right-side drive) does not normally have priority, this arrow is used to allow turning traffic to clear before the next phase begins.

Some variations exist on this set up. One version is a horizontal bar with five lights – the green and amber arrows are located between the standard green and amber lights. A vertical five-light bar holds the arrows underneath the standard green light (in this arrangement, the amber arrow is sometimes omitted, leaving only the green arrow below the steady green light, or possibly an LED-based device capable of showing both green and amber arrows within a single lamp housing).Some newer LED turn arrows seen in parts of Canada are capable of multicoloured animation. Such lights will often display a flashing and animated green or amber arrow when the dedicated turn is allowed but then transform into a red arrow on a white background with a red line through it, emphasising that the turn is no longer allowed. These lights will also often have the words "no turn" displayed, or an explanatory reason why the turn is not allowed, such as "train" in the case of a rail or light rail crossing. 

A third type is known as a "doghouse" or "cluster head" – a vertical column with the two normal lights is on the right side of the signal, a vertical column with the two arrows is located on the left, and the normal red signal is in the middle above the two columns. Cluster signals in Australia and New Zealand use six signals, the sixth being a red arrow that can operate separately from the standard red light. In a fourth type, sometimes seen at intersections in Ontario and Quebec, Canada, there is no dedicated left-turn lamp per se. Instead, the normal green lamp flashes rapidly, indicating permission to go straight as well as make a left turn in front of opposing traffic, which is being held by a steady red lamp. (This "advance green," or flashing green can be somewhat startling and confusing to drivers not familiar with this system. This also can cause confusion amongst visitors to British Columbia, where a flashing green signal denotes a pedestrian-controlled crosswalk. For this reason, Ontario is phasing out the use of flashing green signals and instead replacing them with arrows.)

Yellow trap 
Without an all-red phase, cross-turning traffic may be caught in a yellow trap. When the signal turns amber (also known as yellow), a turning driver may assume oncoming traffic will stop and a crash may result. For this reason, the US bans sequences that may cause a yellow trap.  This can also happen when emergency vehicles or railroads preempt normal signal operation.
 In the United States, signs reading "Oncoming traffic has extended green" or "Oncoming traffic may have extended green" must be posted at intersections where the "yellow trap" condition exists.

Variations
The United States is not party to the Convention and the Manual on Uniform Traffic Control Devices (MUTCD) outlines correct operation in that country. In the US, a single signal head may have three, four, or five aspects (though a single aspect green arrow may be displayed to indicate a continuous movement). The signals must be arranged red, amber, and green vertically (top to bottom) or horizontally (left to right). In the US, a single-aspect flashing amber signal can be used to raise attention to a warning sign and a single-aspect flashing red signal can be used to raise attention to a STOP, DO NOT ENTER, or WRONG WAY sign. Flashing red or amber lights, known as intersection control beacons, are used to reinforce stop signs at intersections. The MUTCD specifies the following vehicular signals:

In the Canadian province of Quebec and the Maritime provinces, lights are often arranged horizontally, but each aspect is a different shape: red is a square (larger than the normal circle) and usually in pairs at either end of the fixture, amber is a diamond, and green is a circle. In many southern and southwestern U.S. states, most traffic signals are similarly horizontal in order to ease wind resistance during storms and hurricanes. Japanese traffic signals mostly follow the same rule except that the "go" signals are referred to as 青 (blue), which they historically were in fact, but this caused complications with the international "green for go" rule, so  in 1973 a decree was issued that the "go" light should be changed to the bluest possible hue of green, thus making it factually greener without having to change the name from 青(blue) to 緑(green).

In the UK, normal traffic lights follow this sequence:
 Red – Stop, do not proceed
 Red and Amber - Get ready to proceed, but do not proceed yet
 Green – Proceed if the intersection or crossing is clear, vehicles are not allowed to block the intersection or crossing
 Amber - Stop, unless it is unsafe to do so.
A speed sign is a special traffic light, variable traffic sign, or variable-message sign giving drivers a recommended speed to approach the next traffic light in its green phase and avoid a stop due to reaching the intersection when lights are red.

Pedestrian signals
Pedestrian signals are used to inform pedestrians when to cross a road. Most pedestrian signal heads will have two lights: a 'walk' light (normally a walking human figure, typically coloured green or white) and a 'don't walk' light (normally either a red man figure or a hand), though other variations exist.

Where pedestrians need to cross the road between junctions, a signal-controlled crossing may be provided as an alternative to a zebra crossing or uncontrolled crossing. Traffic lights are normally used at crossings where vehicle speeds are high, where either vehicle or pedestrian flows are high or near signalised junctions. In the UK, this type of crossing is called a pelican crossing, though more modern iterations are puffin and pedex crossings. In the UK, these crossings normally need at least four traffic signals, which are of a regular type (red, amber, and green), two facing in each direction. Furthermore, pedestrians will be provided with push buttons and pedestrian signals, consisting of a red and green man. Farside signals are located across the crossing, while nearside signals are located below the traffic lights, facing in the direction of oncoming traffic. A HAWK beacon is a special type of traffic used in the US at mid-block crossings. These consist of two red signals above a single amber signal. The beacon is unlit until a pedestrian pushes the cross button. Then a amber light will show, followed by both red lights, at which point the 'Walk' symbol will illuminate for pedestrians. At the end of the crossing phase, the 'Don't Walk' symbol will flash, as will the amber traffic light.
Pedestrians are usually incorporated into urban signalised junctions in one of four ways: no facilities, parallel walk, walk with traffic, or all-red stages No facilities may be provided if pedestrian demand is low, in areas where pedestrians are not permitted, or if there is a subway or overpass. No provision of formal facilities means pedestrians will have to self-evaluate when it is safe to cross, which can be intimidating for pedestrians. With a 'parallel walk' design, pedestrians walk alongside the traffic flow. A leading pedestrian interval may be provided, whereby pedestrians get a 'walk' signal before the traffic gets a green light, allowing pedestrians to establish themselves on the crossing before vehicles begin to turn, to encourage drivers to give way. A 'walk with traffic' facility allows pedestrians to go at the same time as other traffic movements with no conflict between movements. This can work well on one-way roads, where turning movements are banned or where the straight-ahead movement runs in a different stage from the turning movement. A splitter island could also be provided. Traffic will pass on either side of the island and pedestrians can cross the road safely between the other flows.

An all-red stage, also known as a full pedestrian stage, a pedestrian scramble or a Barnes Dance, holds all vehicular traffic at the junction to allow pedestrians time to safely cross without conflict from vehicles. It allows allows the use of diagonal crossings. This may require a longer cycle time and increase pedestrian wait periods, though the latter can be eased by providing two pedestrian stages.
Pedestrian countdown timers are becoming common at urban signal-controlled crossings. Where a pedestrian countdown is shown, it is normally used in conjunction with the flashing hand signal (in the US and Canada) or blackout period (UK), showing the amount of time remaining in seconds until the end of the flashing hand or blackout. Pedestrian countdown timers do not significantly increase or reduce the number of red- and amber-light running drivers. Studies have found that pedestrian countdown timers do significantly improve pedestrian compliance over traditional pedestrian signals; however, results are mixed.

Auditory and tactile signals
In some jurisdictions such as Australia, pedestrian lights are associated with a sound device, for the benefit of blind and visually impaired pedestrians. These make a slow beeping sound when the pedestrian lights are red and a continuous buzzing or fast beeping sound when the lights are green. In the Australian States of Queensland, New South Wales, Victoria, and Western Australia, the sound is produced in the same unit as the push buttons. In a circle above the button, the sound is produced and can be felt along with a raised arrow that points in the direction to walk. This system of assistive technology is also widely used at busy intersections in Canadian cities. In the United Kingdom, the Puffin crossings and their predecessor, the Pelican crossing, will make a fast beeping sound to indicate that it is safe to cross the road. The beeping sound is disabled during the nighttime so as not to disturb any nearby residents. In some states in the United States, at some busy intersections, buttons will make a beeping sound for blind people. When the light changes, a speaker built into the button will play a recording to notify blind people that it is safe to cross. When the signal flashes red, the recording will start to count down with the countdown timer. In several countries such as New Zealand, technology also allows deaf and blind people to feel when lights have changed to allow safe crossing. A small pad, housed within an indentation in the base of the box housing the button mechanism, moves downwards when the lights change to allow crossing. This is designed to be felt by anyone waiting to cross who has limited ability to detect sight or sound. In Japan, a traffic light emits an electronic sound that mimics the sound of birdsong to help the visually impaired. Some traffic lights fix the order and type of sound so that they can tell which direction is a green light. In general, "Piyo" (peep) and "Piyo-piyo", which is a small bird call, and "Kakkō" and "Ka-kakkō", which is a cuckoo call, are associated with this system. Some pedestrian crossings in Lithuania make a slowish beeping sound indicating that the traffic light is about to turn off.

Cycle signals 

Where cycle lanes or cycle tracks exist on the approach to a signal-controlled junction, it must be considered how to incorporate cyclists safely into the junction to reduce conflict between motor vehicles and cyclists.

An advanced stop line can be placed after the stop line at traffic lights. This allows cyclists to position themselves in front of traffic at a red light and get a headstart.

In the US, design advice typically advises that the cycle lane should continue through the junction to the left of the right-turn lane; however, this creates conflict where motor vehicles wish to enter the right lane, as they must cross the cycle lane at a bad angle.

Under Dutch engineering principles, cyclists are instead kept to the right of the junction, with protected kerbs. This improves safety by putting cyclists into the eyeline of motor vehicles at the stop line, allowing cyclists a headstart over turning traffic. This design also allows cyclists to complete far-side turns without having to wait in the centre of the junction. UK engineers have innovated on this design through the Cycle Optimised Protected Signals (CYCLOPS) junction, e.g. in Manchester. This places the cycle track around the edge of the signal junction and gives cyclists and pedestrians a single all-red phase, entirely separate from motor traffic and shortens pedestrian crossing times.

Alternatively, cyclists can be considered pedestrians on approach to a junction, or where a cycle track crosses a road and combined pedestrian-cyclist traffic lights (known as Toucan crossings in the UK) can be provided.

Public transport signals 
Traffic lights for public transport often use signals that are distinct from those for private traffic. They can be letters, arrows or bars of white or coloured light.

Transit signals in North America 
Some systems use the letter B for buses and T for trams. The METRO light rail system in Minneapolis, Minnesota, the Valley Metro Rail in Phoenix, Arizona, and the RTA Streetcar System in New Orleans use a simplified variant of the Belgian/French system in the respective city's central business district where only the "go" and "stop" configurations are used. A third signal equal to amber is accomplished by flashing the "go" signal.

Public transport signals in Europe 
In some European countries and Russia, dedicated traffic signals for public transport (tram, as well any that is using a dedicated lane) have four white lights that form the letter T. If the three top lamps are lit, this means "stop". If the bottom lamp and some lamps on the top row are lit, this means permission to go in a direction shown. In the case of a tram signal, if there are no tram junctions or turns at an intersection, a simpler system of one amber signal in the form of the letter T is used instead; the tram must proceed only when the signal is lit.

In North European countries, the tram signals feature white lights of different forms: "S" for "stop", "—" for "caution" and arrows to permit passage in a given direction.

The Netherlands uses a distinctive "negenoog" (nine-eyed) design shown on the top row of the diagram; bottom row signals are used in Belgium, Luxembourg, France, and Germany. The signals mean (from left to right): "go straight ahead", "go left", "go right", "go in any direction" (like the "green" of a normal traffic light), "stop, unless the emergency brake is needed" (equal to "amber"), and "stop" (equal to "red").

Public transport signals in the Asia-Pacific region 

In Japan, tram signals are under the regular vehicle signal; however, the colour of the signal intended for trams is orange. In Sweden, All signals use white lighting and special symbols ("S", "–" and an arrow) to distinguish them from regular signals. The small light at the top tells the driver when the vehicle's transponder signal is received by the traffic light. In Hong Kong, an amber T-signal is used for trams, in place of the green signal. In addition, at any tramway junction, another set of signals is available to indicate the direction of the tracks. In Australia and New Zealand, a white "B" or "T" sometimes replaces the green light indicating that buses or trams (respectively) have right of way.

Preemption and priority 

Some regions have signals that are interruptible, giving priority to special traffic, usually emergency vehicles such as fire apparatus, ambulances, and police squad cars. Most of the systems operate with small transmitters that send radio waves, infrared signals, or strobe light signals that are received by a sensor on or near the traffic lights. Some systems use audio detection, where a certain type of siren must be used and detected by a receiver on the traffic light structure.

Upon activation, the normal traffic light cycle is suspended and replaced by the "preemption sequence": the traffic lights to all approaches to the intersection are switched to "red" with the exception of the light for the vehicle that has triggered the preemption sequence. Sometimes, an additional signal light is placed nearby to indicate to the preempting vehicle that the preempting sequence has been activated and to warn other motorists of the approach of an emergency vehicle. The normal traffic light cycle resumes after the sensor has been passed by the vehicle that triggered the preemption.

In lieu of preemptive mechanisms, in most jurisdictions, emergency vehicles are not required to respect traffic lights.  However, emergency vehicles must slow down, proceed cautiously and activate their emergency lights to alert oncoming drivers to the preemption when crossing an intersection against the light.

Unlike preemption, which immediately interrupts a signal's normal operation to serve the preempting vehicle and is usually reserved for emergency use, "priority" is a set of strategies intended to reduce delay for specific vehicles, especially mass transit vehicles such as buses. A variety of strategies exist to give priority to transit but they all generally work by detecting approaching transit vehicles and making small adjustments to the signal timing. These adjustments are designed to either decrease the likelihood that the transit vehicle will arrive during a red interval or decrease the length of the red interval for those vehicles that are stopped. Priority does not guarantee that transit vehicles always get a green light the instant they arrive as preemption does.

Operation 

A variety of different control systems are used to operate signal cycles smoothly, ranging from simple clockwork mechanisms to sophisticated computerised control systems. Computerised systems are normally actuated, i.e. controlled by loop detectors or other sensors on junction approaches. Area-wide coordination can allow green wave systems to be set up for vehicles or cycle tracks. Smart traffic light systems combine traditional actuation, a wider array of sensors and artificial intellegence to further improve performance of signal systems. A traffic signal junction or crossing is typically controlled by a controller mounted inside a cabinet nearby.

"Phases" (or "signal groups" in Australia and New Zealand) are indications show simultaneously, e.g. multiple green lights which control the same traffic approach. A "movement" is any path through the junction which vehicles or pedestrians are permitted to take, which is "conflicting" if these paths cross one another. A stage (or "phase" in ANZ) is a group of non-conflicting phases which move at the same time. The stages are collectively known as a "cycle". The time between two conflicting green phases is called an "intergreen period", which is set at an appropriate length for the junction to safely clear, especially for turning traffic which may be waiting in the centre of the junction. This often results in an all red stage, when all approaches are shown a red light and no vehicle can proceed. This all red is sometimes extended to allow a pedestrian scramble, where pedestrians can cross the empty junction in any direction all at once. Some signals have no "all red" phase: the light turns green for cross traffic the instant the other light turns red.

Many traffic light installations are fitted with vehicle actuation, i.e. detection, to improve the flexibility of traffic systems to respond to varying traffic flows. Detectors come in the form of digital sensors fitted to the signal heads or induction loops within the road surface. Induction loops are beneficial due to their smaller chance of breakdown, but their simplicity can limit their ability to handle some situations, particularly involving lighter vehicles such as motorcycles or pedal cycles. This situation most often occurs at times of day when other traffic is sparse as well as when the small vehicle is coming from a direction that does not have a high volume of traffic.

Timing 

The timing of the intergreen is usually based on the size of the intersection, which can range from two to five seconds. Modelling programs include the ability to calculate intergreen times automatically. Intergreen periods are determined by calculating the path distance for every conflict point in the junction, which is the distance travelled to the conflict point by the movement losing right of way minus the distance travelled to the same conflict point by the movement gaining right of way using the possible conflict points (including with pedestrians) and calculating both the time it would take the last vehicle to clear the furthest collision point and the first vehicle from the next stage to arrive at the conflict point. At actuated junctions, integreens can be varied to account for traffic conditions.

Engineers also need to set the amber timings (and red-amber, where appropriate), which is normally standardised by a traffic authority. For example, in the UK, the amber time is fixed nationally at three seconds and the red-amber time at two seconds, which results in a minimum intergreen time of five seconds (plus any all-red time). The US also uses a minimum of three seconds, but local traffic authorities can make timings longer, especially on wider, suburban roads. This variation has resulted in controversy when municipalities with shorter amber times use red light cameras. Where pedestrian signals are used, the timing of the "inivitation to cross" – the period where a steady walk signal shows – and clearance periods – time when the walk signal flashes or no signal is shown – need to be calculated. This is normally set against a design speed, e.g. . Similarly, these can be made extendable using sensors, allowing slower-moving pedestrians more time to cross the street.

Variable lane control 

Variable lane control is a form of intelligent transportation systems which involve the use of lane-use control signals, typically on a gantry above a carriageway. These lights are used in tidal flow systems to allow or forbid traffic to use one or more of the available lanes by the use of green lights or arrows (to permit) or by red lights or crosses (to prohibit). Variable lane control may be in use at toll plazas to indicate open or closed booths; during heavy traffic to facilitate merging traffic from a slip road.

In the US, most notably the Southeastern, there often is a "continuous-flow" lane. This lane is protected by a single, constant-green arrow pointing down at the lane(s) permitting the continuous flow of traffic, without regard to the condition of signals for other lanes or cross streets. Continuous lanes are restricted in that vehicles turning from a side street may not cross over the double white line to enter the continuous lane, and no lane changes are permitted to the continuous lane from an adjacent lane or from the continuous lane to an adjacent lane until the double white line has been passed. Some continuous lanes are protected by a raised curb located between the continuous lane and a normal traffic lane, with white and/or amber reflective paint or tape, prohibiting turning or adjacent traffic from entering the lane. Continuous-flow traffic lanes are found only at "T" intersections where there is no side street or driveway entrance on the right side of the main thoroughfare; additionally, no pedestrians are permitted to cross the main thoroughfare at intersections with a continuous-flow lane, although crossing at the side street may be permitted. Intersections with continuous-flow lanes will be posted with a white regulatory sign approximately  before the intersection with the phrase, "right lane continuous traffic," or other, similar, wording. If the arrow is extinguished for any reason, whether by malfunction or design, traffic through the continuous lane will revert to the normal traffic pattern for adjacent lanes, except that turning or moving into or out of the restricted lane is still prohibited.

Waterways and railways 
The three-aspect standard is also used at locks on the Upper Mississippi River. Red means that another vessel is passing through. Amber means that the lock chamber is being emptied or filled to match the level of the approaching vessel. After the gate opens, green means that the vessel may enter.

Railroad signals, for stopping trains in their own right of way, generally use the opposite positioning of the colours; that is, for signals above the driver's eyeline, green on top and red below is the standard placement of the signal colours on railroad tracks.  There are three reasons for this variation: there is no risk that railway signals will be masked by a tall vehicle between the driver and the signal; train speeds in fog are much higher than for road vehicles, so it is important that the most restrictive signal is closest to the driver's eyeline; and with railway signals often in exposed rural locations, there is a risk of any signal other than the bottom one being masked by snow building up on the hood of the signal below.

Rules 

Traffic lights control flows of traffic using social norms and legal rules. In most jurisdictions, it is against the law to disobey traffic signals and the police, or devices such as red light cameras, can issue fines or other penalties – and in some cases prosecute – drivers who break those laws. US-based studies have found that the majority of drivers think that it is dangerous to run a red light at speed and the most common reason for red light running include inattentive driving, following an oversized vehicle or during inclement weather.

The rules governing traffic light junctions for vehicles differ by jurisdiction. For example, it is common in North America that drivers can turn kerb-to-kerb (i.e. turning right at most junctions), even when a red light shows. On the other hand, this turn on red rule is uncommon in Europe, unless an arrow signal or traffic sign specifically permits it.

Design

Bulbs 

Conventional traffic signal lighting, still common in some areas, uses a standard light bulb. The light then bounces off a mirrored glass or polished aluminium reflector bowl, and out through a polycarbonate plastic or glass signal lens. In some signals, these lenses were cut to include a specific refracting pattern. Traditionally, incandescent and halogen bulbs were used. Because of the low efficiency of light output and a single point of failure (filament burnout), some traffic authorities are choosing to retrofit traffic signals with LED arrays that consume less power, have increased light output, and last significantly longer. Moreover, in the event of an individual LED failure, the aspect will still operate albeit with a reduced light output. The light pattern of an LED array can be comparable to the pattern of an incandescent or halogen bulb fitted with a prismatic lens.

The low energy consumption of LED lights can pose a driving risk in some areas during winter. Unlike incandescent and halogen bulbs, which generally get hot enough to melt away any snow that may settle on individual lights, LED displays – using only a fraction of the energy – remain too cool for this to happen. As a response to the safety concerns, a heating element on the lens was developed.

Programmable visibility signals 

Signals such as the 3M High Visibility Signal utilize light-diffusing optics and a Fresnel lens to create the signal indication. The light from a 150 W PAR46 sealed-beam lamp in these "programmable visibility" signals passes through a set of two glass lenses at the back of the signal. The first lens, a frosted glass diffusing lens, diffuses the light into a uniform ball of light around five inches in diameter. The light then passes through a nearly identical lens known as an optical limiter (3M's definition of the lens itself), also known as a "programming lens", also five inches in diameter.

Using a special aluminium foil-based adhesive tape, these signals are "masked" or programmed by the programming lens so that only certain lanes of traffic will view the indication. At the front of these programmable visibility signals is a 12" Fresnel lens, each lens tinted to meet United States Institute of Transportation Engineers (ITE) chromaticity and luminance standards. The Fresnel lens collimates the light output created by the lamp and creates a uniform display of light for the lane in which it is intended.

In addition to being positioned and mounted for desired visibility for their respective traffic, some traffic lights are also aimed, louvered, or shaded to minimize misinterpretation from other lanes. For example, a Fresnel lens on an adjacent through-lane signal may be aimed to prevent left-turning traffic from anticipating its own green arrow. Intelight Inc. manufactures a programmable traffic signal that uses a software-controlled LED array and electronics to steer the light beam toward the desired approach. The signal is programmed unlike the 3M and McCain models. It requires a connection to a laptop or smartphone with the manufacturer’s software installed. Connections can be made directly with a direct-serial interface kit, or wirelessly with a radio kit over WIFI to the signal.In addition to aiming, Fresnel lenses, and louvers, visors and back panels are also useful in areas where sunlight would diminish the contrast and visibility of a signal face. Typical applications for these signals were skewed intersections, specific multi-lane control, left-turn pocket signals, or other areas where complex traffic situations existed.

Size 
Previously the standard had been ; however, those are slowly being phased out in favour of the larger and more visible 12 inch lights.

In the United Kingdom, 12-inch lights were implemented only with Mellor Design Signal heads designed by David Mellor. These were designed for symbolic optics to compensate for the light loss caused by the symbol. However, following a study sponsored by the UK Highways Agency and completed by Aston University, Birmingham, UK, an enhanced optical design was introduced in the mid-1990s. Criticism of sunlight washout (cannot see the illuminated signal due to sunlight falling on it), and sun-phantom (signal appearing to be illuminated even when not due to sunlight reflecting from the parabolic mirror at low sun angles), led to the design of a signal that used lenslets to focus light from a traditional incandescent bulb through apertures in a matt black front mask. This cured both problems in an easily manufactured solution. This design proved very successful and was taken into production by a number of traffic signal manufacturers through the engineering designs of Dr. Mark Aston, working firstly at the SIRA Ltd in Kent, and latterly as an independent optical designer. The manufacturers took a licence for the generic design from the Highways Agency, with Dr. Aston engineering a unique solution for each manufacturer. Producing both bulb and LED versions of the signal aspects, these signals are still the most common type of traffic light on UK roads. With the invention of anti-phantom, highly visible Aston lenses, lights of  could be designed to give the same output as plain lenses, so a larger surface area was unnecessary. Exemptions are made for temporary or replacement signals.

Mounting and placement 

The MUTCD identifies five types of traffic light mounts. On pedestals, signal heads are mounted on a single pole (this is the normal installation method for the UK). On mast arms, signal heads are mounted on a rigid arm over the road protuding from the pole. On strained poles, signals are suspended over a roadway on a wire, attached to poles at opposite kerbs. This is the most common installation method in the United States. Unipoles are similar to strain poles, but a single structure over the road, rather than two poles linked with wire. Finally, signals can be attached to existing structures such as an overpass. Dummy lights are traffic signs located in the centre of a junction, which operate on a fixed cycle. These have generally been decommissioned due to safety concerns; however, a number remain due to historic value.

Signals can either be placed nearside – between the stop line and the kerbline of the intersecting road – or farside – on the opposite side of the junction. In European countries, signals are often placed on the nearside. In the UK, at leats two signal heads are required (known as the primary and secondary heads), one of which is normally nearside and the other of which could be nearside or farside. In the US, signals are normally located farside, though in some states, nearside signals are also used. Nearside signals can be beneficial to road safety, as drivers have more time to see a red light and are less likely to encroach on pedestrian crossings.

Effects 
Drivers spend on average around 2% of journey time passing through signalised junctions. Traffic lights can increase the traffic capacity at intersections and reduce delay for side road traffic, but can also result in increased delay for main road traffic. Hans Monderman, the innovative Dutch traffic engineer, and pioneer of shared space schemes, was sceptical of their role, and is quoted as having said of them: "We only want traffic lights where they are useful and I haven't found anywhere where they are useful yet."

A World Economic Forum study found that signalised junctions are linked to higher rates of localised air pollution. Drivers accelerate and stop frequently at lights and as such peak particle concentration can be around 29 times higher than during free-flow conditions. The WEF recommends that traffic authorities synchronise traffic signals, consider alternative traffic management systems and consider placing traffic lights away from residential areas, schools, and hospitals.

The separation of conflicting streams of traffic in time can reduce the chances of right-angle collisions by turning traffic and cross traffic, but they can increase the frequency of rear-end crashes by up to 50%. Since right-angled and turn-against-traffic collisions are more likely to result in injuries, this is often an acceptable trade-off. They can also adversely affect the safety of bicycle and pedestrian traffic. Between 1979 and 1988, the city of Philadelphia, Pennsylvania, removed signals at 199 intersections that were not warranted. On average, the intersections had 24% fewer crashes after the unwarranted signals were removed. The traffic lights had been erected in the 1960s because of since-resolved protests over traffic. By 1992, over 800 traffic lights had been removed at 426 intersections, and the number of crashes at these intersections dropped by 60%.

Justification 

Criteria have been developed to help ensure that new traffic lights are installed only where they will do more good than harm and to justify the removal of existing traffic lights where they are not warranted. They are most often placed on arterial roads at intersections with either another arterial road or a collector road, or on an expressway where an interchange is not warranted. In some situations, traffic signals can also be found on collector roads in busy settings.

In the United States, the criteria for installation of a traffic control signal are prescribed by the Manual on Uniform Traffic Control Devices (MUTCD), which defines the criteria in nine warrants:
 Eight-hour vehicular volume. Traffic volume must exceed prescribed minima for eight hours of an average weekday.
 Four-hour vehicular volume. Traffic volume must exceed prescribed minima for four hours of an average weekday.
 Peak hour volume or delay. This is applied only in unusual cases, such as office parks, industrial complexes, and park and ride lots that attract or discharge large numbers of vehicles in a short time, and for a minimum of one hour of an average weekday. The side road traffic suffers undue delays when entering or crossing the major street.
 Pedestrian volume.  If the traffic volume on a major street is so heavy that pedestrians experience excessive delays in attempting to cross it.
 School crossing. If the traffic density at school crossing times exceeds one per minute which is considered to provide too few gaps in the traffic for children to safely cross the street.
 Coordinated signal system.  For places where adjacent traffic control signals do not keep traffic grouped together efficiently.
 Crash experience. The volumes in the eight- and four-hour warrants may be reduced if five or more right-angle and cross traffic turn collisions have happened at the intersection in a twelve-month period.
 Roadway network. Installing a traffic control signal at some intersections might be justified to encourage concentration and organization of traffic flow on a roadway network.
 Intersection near a grade crossing. A traffic control signal is often justified at an intersection near a railroad crossing, in order to provide a preemption sequence to allow traffic queued up on the tracks an opportunity to clear the tracks before the train arrives.

In the US, An intersection is usually required to meet one or more of these warrants before a signal is installed. However, meeting one or more warrants does not require the installation of a traffic signal, it only suggests that they may be suitable. It could be that a roundabout would work better. There may be other unconsidered conditions that lead traffic engineers to conclude that a signal is undesirable. For example, it may be decided not to install a signal at an intersection if traffic stopped by it will back up and block another, more heavily trafficked intersection. Also, if a signal meets only the peak hour warrant, the advantages during that time may not outweigh the disadvantages during the rest of the day.

In other contexts 
The symbolism of a traffic light (and the meanings of the three primary colours used in traffic lights) are frequently found in many other contexts. Since they are often used as single spots of colour without the context of vertical position, they are typically not comprehensible to up to one in ten males who are colour blind.

Traffic lights have also been used in computer software, such as the macOS user interface, and in pieces of artwork, particularly the Traffic Light tree in London, UK.

Racing 

Automobile racing circuits can also use standard traffic signals to indicate to racing car drivers the status of racing. On an oval track, four sets may be used, two facing a straight-away and two facing the middle of the 180-degree turn between straight-away. Green would indicate racing is underway, while amber would indicate to slow or while following a pace car; red would indicate to stop, probably for emergency reasons.

Scuderia Ferrari, a Formula One racing team, formerly used a traffic light system during their pit stops to signal to their drivers when to leave the pits. The red light was on when the tires were being changed and fuel was being added, amber was on when the tires were changed, and green was on when all work was completed. The system is (usually) completely automatic. However, the system was withdrawn after the 2008 Singapore Grand Prix, due to the fact that it heavily delayed Felipe Massa during the race, when he was in the lead. Usually, the system was automatic, but heavy traffic in the pit lane forced the team to operate it manually. A mechanic accidentally pressed the green light button when the fuel hose was still attached to the car, causing Massa to drive off, towing the fuel hose along. Additionally, Massa drove into the path of Adrian Sutil, earning him a penalty. He finally stopped at the end of the pit lane, forcing Ferrari's mechanics to sprint down the whole of the pit lane to remove the hose. As a result of this, and the penalty he also incurred, Massa finished 13th. Ferrari decided to use a traditional "lollipop" for the remainder of the 2008 season.

Another type of traffic light that is used in racing is the Christmas Tree, which is used in drag racing. The Christmas Tree has six lights: a blue staging light, three amber lights, a green light, and a red light. The blue staging light is divided into two parts: Pre-stage and stage. Sometimes, there are two sets of bulbs on top of each other to represent them. Once a driver is staged at the starting line, then the starter will activate the light to commence racing, which can be done in two ways. If a Pro tree is used, then the three amber lights will flash at the same time. For the Sportsman tree, the amber light will flash from top to bottom. When the green light comes up, the race officially begins but if a driver crosses the line before that happens, then a red light will come up and that will be a foul.

As a rating mechanism 

The colours red, amber, and green are often used as a simple-to-understand rating system for products and processes. It may be extended by analogy to provide a greater range of intermediate colours, with red and green at the extremes.

Gallery

In Unicode

See also 

 Ampelmännchen
 Glossary of road transport terms
 Induction loop
 Lane control lights
 Level crossing
 North American railroad signals, rail equivalent
 Pedestrian crossing
 Railway signal, another rail equivalent
 Ramp meter
 Stack light, used in industrial process control
 Traffic light coalition
 Traffic light control and coordination
 Traffic-light signalling and operation
 Traffic optimization
 Traffic robots in Kinshasa
 Slow Children At Play
 Smart traffic light
 Yellow trap

Notes

References

Citations

 City of Beacon. Canajoharie, New York: Credits. Retrieved 30 September 2008.
 Croton-on-Hudson Historical Society. Canajoharie, New York: Credits. Retrieved 30 September 2008.
 Villages of Canajoharie & Palatine Bridge. Canajoharie, New York: Credits. Retrieved 30 September 2008.

External links 

 FHWA Arterial Management Website, latest information on traffic signal operations
 Animations of various US signal phasings
 SCATSSydney Coordinated Adaptive Traffic System
 Safety Evaluation of Converting Traffic Signals from Incandescent to Light-emitting Diodes: Summary Report Federal Highway Administration
 Safety Evaluation of Discontinuing Late-night Flash Operations at Signalized Intersections: Summary Report Federal Highway Administration
 Traffic signals, 1922, digitized NYPD photograph from the Lloyd Sealy Library Digital Collections

1868 introductions
Street furniture
Traffic law
Articles containing video clips
History of road transport
Pedestrian crossings